Philip Gubenco (born 14 March 1982) is a Canadian former professional tennis player.

A left-handed player from Quebec, Gubenco was an ITF world number four ranked junior in doubles, forming a successful partnership with Andy Roddick which included World Super Juniors and Eddie Herr International titles.

Gubenco had a best singles ranking of 519 on the professional tour and peaked at 279 in doubles. In 1999 he made an ATP Tour singles main draw appearance as a wildcard at the Canadian Open and was beaten in the first round by Ramón Delgado. He featured in further Canadian Open main draws as a doubles player.

Most of his career was played at ITF Futures level and he was a doubles champion in nine tournaments.

ITF Futures finals

Singles: 3 (0–3)

Doubles: 15 (9–6)

References

External links
 
 

1982 births
Living people
Canadian male tennis players
Racket sportspeople from Quebec
20th-century Canadian people
21st-century Canadian people